Vulca was an Etruscan artist from the town of Veii. The only Etruscan artist mentioned by ancient writers, he worked for the last of the Roman kings, Tarquinius Superbus. He is responsible for creating a terracotta statue of Jupiter that was inside the Temple of Jupiter Optimus Maximus on the Capitoline Hill, and possibly the Apollo of Veii. His statue of Jupiter, which being made of terracotta had a red face, was so famous that victorious Roman generals would paint their faces red during their triumphal marches through Rome. Pliny the Elder wrote that his works were "the finest images of deities of that era...more admired than gold."

References

Italian sculptors
Italian male sculptors
Etruscan ceramics
Year of birth unknown
Year of death unknown
6th-century BC sculptors
Etruscans